UCBC is an acronym that may refer to:
Underwater Council of British Columbia
Université Chrétienne Bilingue du Congo
University Centre at Blackburn College
University College Boat Club (Durham) 
University College Boat Club (Oxford)
 University of California, Behind Costco